In mathematics, a continuous function is a function such that a continuous variation (that is a change without jump) of the argument induces a continuous variation of the value of the function. This means that there are no abrupt changes in value, known as discontinuities. More precisely, a function is continuous if arbitrarily small changes in its value can be assured by restricting to sufficiently small changes of its argument. Up until the 19th century, mathematicians largely relied on intuitive notions of continuity, and considered only continuous functions. The epsilon–delta definition of a limit was introduced to formalize the definition of continuity.

Continuity is one of the core concepts of calculus and mathematical analysis, where arguments and values of functions are real and complex numbers. The concept has been generalized to functions between metric spaces and between topological spaces. The latter are the most general continuous functions, and their definition is the basis of topology.

A stronger form of continuity is uniform continuity. In order theory, especially in domain theory, a related concept of continuity is Scott continuity.

As an example, the function  denoting the height of a growing flower at time  would be considered continuous. In contrast, the function  denoting the amount of money in a bank account at time  would be considered discontinuous, since it "jumps" at each point in time when money is deposited or withdrawn.

History

A form of the epsilon–delta definition of continuity was first given by Bernard Bolzano in 1817. Cours d'Analyse, p. 34). Cauchy defined infinitely small quantities in terms of variable quantities, and his definition of continuity closely parallels the infinitesimal definition used today (see microcontinuity). The formal definition and the distinction between pointwise continuity and uniform continuity were first given by Bolzano in the 1830s but the work wasn't published until the 1930s. Like Bolzano, Karl Weierstrass denied continuity of a function at a point c unless it was defined at and on both sides of c, but Édouard Goursat allowed the function to be defined only at and on one side of c, and Camille Jordan allowed it even if the function was defined only at c. All three of those nonequivalent definitions of pointwise continuity are still in use. Eduard Heine provided the first published definition of uniform continuity in 1872, but based these ideas on lectures given by Peter Gustav Lejeune Dirichlet in 1854.

Real functions

Definition

A real function, that is a function from real numbers to real numbers, can be represented by a graph in the Cartesian plane; such a function is continuous if, roughly speaking, the graph is a single unbroken curve whose domain is the entire real line.  A more mathematically rigorous definition is given below.

Continuity of real functions is usually defined in terms of limits.

There are several different definitions of (global) continuity of a function, which depend on the nature of its domain. 

A function is continuous on an open interval if the interval is contained in the domain of the function, and the function is continuous at every point of the interval. A function that is continuous on the interval  (the whole real line) is often called simply a continuous function; one says also that such a function is continuous everywhere. For example, all polynomial functions are continuous everywhere.

A function is continuous on a semi-open or a closed interval, if the interval is contained in the domain of the function, the function is continuous at every interior point of the interval, and the value of the function at each endpoint that belongs to the interval is the limit of the values of the function when the variable tends to the endpoint from the interior of the interval. For example, the function  is continuous on its whole domain, which is the closed interval 

Many commonly encountered functions are partial functions that have a domain formed by all real numbers, except some isolated points. Examples are the functions  and  When they are continuous on their domain, one says, in some contexts, that they are continuous, although they are not continuous everywhere. In other contexts, mainly when one is interested with their behavior near the exceptional points, one says that they are discontinuous.

A partial function is discontinuous at a point, if the point belongs to the topological closure of its domain, and either the point does not belong to the domain of the function, or the function is not continuous at the point. A point where a function is discontinuous is called a discontinuity.

Using mathematical notation, there are several ways to define continuous functions in each of the three senses mentioned above.

Let  be a function defined on a subset  of the set  of real numbers.

Some possible choices include 
:  is a closed interval, or
:  is an open interval.

Definition in terms of limits of functions

Second, the limit of that equation has to exist. Third, the value of this limit must equal 

(Here, we have assumed that the domain of f does not have any isolated points.)

Definition in terms of neighborhoods
A neighborhood of a point c is a set that contains, at least, all points within some fixed distance of c.  Intuitively, a function is continuous at a point c if the range of f over the neighborhood of c shrinks to a single point  as the width of the neighborhood around c shrinks to zero.  More precisely, a function f is continuous at a point c of its domain if, for any neighborhood  there is a neighborhood  in its domain such that  whenever 

This definition only requires that the domain and the codomain are topological spaces and is thus the most general definition.  It follows from this definition that a function f is automatically continuous at every isolated point of its domain.  As a specific example, every real valued function on the set of integers is continuous.

Definition in terms of limits of sequences

One can instead require that for any sequence  of points in the domain which converges to c, the corresponding sequence  converges to   In mathematical notation,

Weierstrass and Jordan definitions (epsilon–delta) of continuous functions

More intuitively, we can say that if we want to get all the  values to stay in some small neighborhood around  we simply need to choose a small enough neighborhood for the  values around  If we can do that no matter how small the  neighborhood is, then  is continuous at 

In modern terms, this is generalized by the definition of continuity of a function with respect to a basis for the topology, here the metric topology.

Weierstrass had required that the interval  be entirely within the domain , but Jordan removed that restriction.

Definition in terms of control of the remainder
In proofs and numerical analysis we often need to know how fast limits are converging, or in other words, control of the remainder. We can formalize this to a definition of continuity. 
A function  is called a control function if
 C is non-decreasing

A function  is C-continuous at  if there exists such a neighbourhood  that 

A function is continuous in  if it is C-continuous for some control function C.

This approach leads naturally to refining the notion of  continuity by restricting the set of admissible control functions.
 
respectively

Definition using oscillation

Continuity can also be defined in terms of oscillation: a function f is continuous at a point  if and only if its oscillation at that point is zero; in symbols,  A benefit of this definition is that it  discontinuity: the oscillation gives how  the function is discontinuous at a point.

The oscillation is equivalent to the  definition by a simple re-arrangement, and by using a limit (lim sup, lim inf) to define oscillation: if (at a given point) for a given  there is no  that satisfies the  definition, then the oscillation is at least  and conversely if for every  there is a desired  the oscillation is 0. The oscillation definition can be naturally generalized to maps from a topological space to a metric space.

Definition using the hyperreals
Cauchy defined continuity of a function in the following intuitive terms: an infinitesimal change in the independent variable corresponds to an infinitesimal change of the dependent variable (see Cours d'analyse, page 34). Non-standard analysis is a way of making this mathematically rigorous. The real line is augmented by the addition of infinite and infinitesimal numbers to form the hyperreal numbers.  In nonstandard analysis, continuity can be defined as follows.

(see microcontinuity).  In other words, an infinitesimal increment of the independent variable always produces to an infinitesimal change of the dependent variable, giving a modern expression to Augustin-Louis Cauchy's definition of continuity.

Construction of continuous functions

Checking the continuity of a given function can be simplified by checking one of the above defining properties for the building blocks of the given function. It is straightforward to show that the sum of two functions, continuous on some domain, is also continuous on this domain. Given

then the 
 

is continuous in 

Combining the above preservations of continuity and the continuity of constant functions and of the identity function   one arrives at the continuity of all polynomial functions  such as

(pictured on the right).

In the same way it can be shown that the 

is continuous in 

This implies that, excluding the roots of  the 

For example, the function (pictured)

is defined for all real numbers  and is continuous at every such point. Thus it is a continuous function.

Since the function sine is continuous on all reals, the sinc function  is defined and continuous for all real  However, unlike the previous example, G  be extended to a continuous function on  real numbers, by  the value  to be 1, which is the limit of  when x approaches 0, i.e.,

Thus, by setting

the sinc-function becomes a continuous function on all real numbers. The term  is used in such cases, when (re)defining values of a function to coincide with the appropriate limits make a function continuous at specific points.

A more involved construction of continuous functions is the function composition. Given two continuous functions
 
their composition, denoted as

This construction allows stating, for example, that
 
is continuous for all

Examples of discontinuous functions

An example of a discontinuous function is the Heaviside step function , defined by

Pick for instance . Intuitively we can think of this type of discontinuity as a sudden jump in function values.

Similarly, the signum or sign function

is discontinuous at  but continuous everywhere else. Yet another example: the function

Besides plausible continuities and discontinuities like above, there are also functions with a behavior, often coined pathological, for example, Thomae's function,

is continuous at all irrational numbers and discontinuous at all rational numbers. In a similar vein, Dirichlet's function, the indicator function for the set of rational numbers,

is nowhere continuous.

Properties

A useful lemma
Let  be a function that is continuous at a point  and  be a value such  Then  throughout some neighbourhood of 

Proof: By the definition of continuity, take  , then there exists  such that 

Suppose there is a point in the neighbourhood  for which  then we have the contradiction

Intermediate value theorem
The intermediate value theorem is an existence theorem, based on the real number property of completeness, and states:

For example, if a child grows from 1 m to 1.5 m between the ages of two and six years, then, at some time between two and six years of age, the child's height must have been 1.25 m.

Extreme value theorem
These statements are not, in general, true if the function is defined on an open interval  (or any set that is not both closed and bounded), as, for example, the continuous function  defined on the open interval (0,1), does not attain a maximum, being unbounded above.

Relation to differentiability and integrability
Every differentiable function

is continuous, as can be shown. The converse  does not hold: for example, the absolute value function

is everywhere continuous. Weierstrass's function is also everywhere continuous but nowhere differentiable.

The derivative f′(x) of a differentiable function f(x) need not be continuous. If f′(x) is continuous, f(x) is said to be continuously differentiable. The set of such functions is denoted  More generally, the set of functions

(from an open interval (or open subset of )  to the reals) such that f is  times differentiable and such that the -th derivative of f is continuous is denoted  See differentiability class.

Every continuous function

is integrable (for example in the sense of the Riemann integral). The converse does not hold, as the (integrable, but discontinuous) sign function shows.

Pointwise and uniform limits

Given a sequence

of functions such that the limit

exists for all , the resulting function  is referred to as the pointwise limit of the sequence of functions   The pointwise limit function need not be continuous, even if all functions  are continuous, as the animation at the right shows. However, f is continuous if all functions  are continuous and the sequence converges uniformly, by the uniform convergence theorem. This theorem can be used to show that the exponential functions, logarithms, square root function, and trigonometric functions are continuous.

Directional and semi-continuity

Discontinuous functions may be discontinuous in a restricted way, giving rise to the concept of directional continuity (or right and left continuous functions) and semi-continuity. Roughly speaking, a function is  if no jump occurs when the limit point is approached from the right. Formally, f is said to be right-continuous at the point c if the following holds: For any number  however small, there exists some number  such that for all x in the domain with  the value of  will satisfy

This is the same condition as for continuous functions, except that it is required to hold for x strictly larger than c only. Requiring it instead for all x with  yields the notion of  functions. A function is continuous if and only if it is both right-continuous and left-continuous.

A function f is  if, roughly, any jumps that might occur only go down, but not up. That is, for any  there exists some number  such that for all x in the domain with  the value of  satisfies

Continuous functions between metric spaces 

The concept of continuous real-valued functions can be generalized to functions between metric spaces. A metric space is a set  equipped with a function (called metric)  that can be thought of as a measurement of the distance of any two elements in X. Formally, the metric is a function

that satisfies a number of requirements, notably the triangle inequality.

The set of points at which a function between metric spaces is continuous is a  set – this follows from the  definition of continuity.

This notion of continuity is applied, for example, in functional analysis. A key statement in this area says that a linear operator

for all

Uniform, Hölder and Lipschitz continuity

Intuitively, a function f as above is uniformly continuous if the  does
not depend on the point c. More precisely, it is required that for every real number  there exists  such that for every  with  we have that  Thus, any uniformly continuous function is continuous. The converse does not hold in general, but holds when the domain space X is compact. Uniformly continuous maps can be defined in the more general situation of uniform spaces.

A function is Hölder continuous with exponent α (a real number) if there is a constant K such that for all  the inequality

holds. Any Hölder continuous function is uniformly continuous. The particular case  is referred to as Lipschitz continuity. That is, a function is Lipschitz continuous if there is a constant K such that the inequality

holds for any  The Lipschitz condition occurs, for example, in the Picard–Lindelöf theorem concerning the solutions of ordinary differential equations.

Continuous functions between topological spaces

Another, more abstract, notion of continuity is continuity of functions between topological spaces in which there generally is no formal notion of distance, as there is in the case of metric spaces. A topological space is a set X together with a topology on X, which is a set of subsets of X satisfying a few requirements with respect to their unions and intersections that generalize the properties of the open balls in metric spaces while still allowing to talk about the neighbourhoods of a given point. The elements of a topology are called open subsets of X (with respect to the topology).

A function

between two topological spaces X and Y is continuous if for every open set  the inverse image

is an open subset of X. That is, f is a function between the sets X and Y (not on the elements of the topology ), but the continuity of f depends on the topologies used on X and Y.

This is equivalent to the condition that the preimages of the closed sets (which are the complements of the open subsets) in Y are closed in X.

An extreme example: if a set X is given the discrete topology (in which every subset is open), all functions

to any topological space T are continuous. On the other hand, if X is equipped with the indiscrete topology (in which the only open subsets are the empty set and X) and the space T set is at least T0, then the only continuous functions are the constant functions. Conversely, any function whose codomain is indiscrete is continuous.

Continuity at a point 

The translation in the language of neighborhoods of the -definition of continuity leads to the following definition of the continuity at a point:

This definition is equivalent to the same statement with neighborhoods restricted to open neighborhoods and can be restated in several ways by using preimages rather than images.

As an open set is a set that is a neighborhood of all its points, a function  is continuous at every point of  if and only if it is a continuous function.

If X and Y are metric spaces, it is equivalent to consider the neighborhood system of open balls centered at x and f(x) instead of all neighborhoods. This gives back the above  definition of continuity in the context of metric spaces.  In general topological spaces, there is no notion of nearness or distance. If however the target space is a Hausdorff space, it is still true that f is continuous at a if and only if the limit of f as x approaches a is f(a). At an isolated point, every function is continuous.

Alternative definitions 
Several equivalent definitions for a topological structure exist and thus there are several equivalent ways to define a continuous function.

Sequences and nets 
In several contexts, the topology of a space is conveniently  specified in terms of limit points.  In many instances, this is accomplished by specifying when a point is the limit of a sequence, but for some spaces that are too large in some sense, one specifies also when a point is the limit of more general sets of points indexed by a directed set, known as nets.  A function is (Heine-)continuous only if it takes limits of sequences to limits of sequences.  In the former case, preservation of limits is also sufficient; in the latter, a function may preserve all limits of sequences yet still fail to be continuous, and preservation of nets is a necessary and sufficient condition.

In detail, a function  is sequentially continuous if whenever a sequence  in  converges to a limit  the sequence  converges to   Thus sequentially continuous functions "preserve sequential limits".  Every continuous function is sequentially continuous.  If  is a first-countable space and countable choice holds, then the converse also holds: any function preserving sequential limits is continuous.  In particular, if  is a metric space, sequential continuity and continuity are equivalent.  For non first-countable spaces, sequential continuity might be strictly weaker than continuity. (The spaces for which the two properties are equivalent are called sequential spaces.) This motivates the consideration of nets instead of sequences in general topological spaces.  Continuous functions preserve limits of nets, and in fact this property characterizes continuous functions.

For instance, consider the case of real-valued functions of one real variable:

Proof.

For any such  we can find a natural number  such that for all 

Assume on the contrary that  is sequentially continuous and proceed by contradiction: suppose  is not continuous at 

then we can take  and call the corresponding point : in this way we have defined a sequence  such that

by construction  but , which contradicts the hypothesis of sequentially continuity.

Closure operator and interior operator definitions 

In terms of the interior operator, a function  between topological spaces is continuous if and only if for every subset  

In terms of the closure operator,  is continuous if and only if for every subset  

Instead of specifying topological spaces by their open subsets, any topology on  can alternatively be determined by a closure operator or by an interior operator.  
Specifically, the map that sends a subset  of a topological space  to its topological closure  satisfies the Kuratowski closure axioms.

Filters and prefilters 

Continuity can also be characterized in terms of filters.

Properties
 X is compact, then f(X) is compact.
 X is connected, then f(X) is connected.
 X is path-connected, then f(X) is path-connected.
 X is Lindelöf, then f(X) is Lindelöf.
 X is separable, then f(X) is separable.

is continuous if and only if  (see also comparison of topologies). More generally, a continuous function

Homeomorphisms
In fact, if an open map f has an inverse function, that inverse is continuous, and if a continuous map g has an inverse, that inverse is open. Given a bijective function f between two topological spaces, the inverse function  need not be continuous.

If a continuous bijection has as its domain a compact space and its codomain is Hausdorff, then it is a homeomorphism.

Defining topologies via continuous functions
Given a function

If f is surjective, this topology is canonically identified with the quotient topology under the equivalence relation defined by f.

Dually, for a function f from a set S to a topological space X, the initial topology on S is defined by designating as an open set every subset A of S such that  for some open subset U of X.  If S has an existing topology, f is continuous with respect to this topology if and only if the existing topology is finer than the initial topology on S.  Thus the initial topology can be characterized as the coarsest topology on S that makes f continuous.  If f is injective, this topology is canonically identified with the subspace topology of S, viewed as a subset of X.

A topology on a set S is uniquely determined by the class of all continuous functions  into all topological spaces X. Dually, a similar idea can be applied to maps

Related notions

Were  not continuous then it could not possibly have a continuous extension. The Blumberg theorem states that if  is an arbitrary function then there exists a dense subset  of  such that the restriction  is continuous; in other words, every function  can be restricted to some dense subset on which it is continuous. 

Various other mathematical domains use the concept of continuity in different, but related meanings. This notion of continuity is the same as topological continuity when the partially ordered sets are given the Scott topology.

In category theory, a functor

between two categories is called  if it commutes with small limits. That is to say,

A  is a generalization of metric spaces and posets, which uses the concept of quantales, and that can be used to unify the notions of metric spaces and domains.

See also 

 Continuity (mathematics)
 Absolute continuity
 Dini continuity
 Equicontinuity
 Geometric continuity
 Parametric continuity
 Classification of discontinuities
 Coarse function
 Continuous function (set theory)
 Continuous stochastic process
 Normal function
 Open and closed maps
 Piecewise
 Symmetrically continuous function

 Direction-preserving function - an analogue of a continuous function in discrete spaces.

References

Bibliography 

  
 

 
Calculus
Types of functions